State Highway 167 (SH-167) is a state highway in Idaho from SH-78 in Grand View to SH-67 near Mountain Home Air Force Base.

Route description
SH-167 starts at the intersection with SH-78 in Grand View. As Roosevelt Avenue, the two-lane road travels north through Grand View and becomes Grandview Road when it crosses the Snake River into Elmore County.

History
SH-167 was originally part of SH-67. The history of these roads goes back to at least the 1930s, when the first all-weather gravel road connecting Grand View and Mountain Home was built (represented by today's SH-167, SH-67 and SH-51), and can be seen on a 1937 map of the area.  When Idaho expanded SH-67 to four lanes for base-bound traffic, the segment south to Grand View was delisted and unsigned from the official state highway system, yet was still maintained by the Idaho Transportation Department (ITD), and still referred to in the milepoint log as "(SH-67)" twice.

The highway has since been relisted as SH-167, noting its heritage as part of the original SH-67.

Major junctions

See also

 List of state highways in Idaho
 List of highways numbered 167

References

External links

167
Transportation in Owyhee County, Idaho
Transportation in Elmore County, Idaho